is a city in Mie Prefecture, Japan. , the city had an estimated population of 197,977 in 87,680 households and a population density of 1000 persons per km².

Geography
Suzuka is in northeastern Mie Prefecture, in northern Kii Peninsula, bordered by Ise Bay to the east. Parts of the city are within the borders of the Ise-no-Umi Prefectural Natural Park and the Suzuka Quasi-National Park.

Neighboring municipalities
Mie Prefecture
Yokkaichi
Tsu
Kameyama
Shiga Prefecture
Kōka

Climate
Suzuka has a Humid subtropical climate (Köppen Cfa) characterized by warm summers and cool winters with light to no snowfall.  The average annual temperature in Suzuka is 15.6 °C. The average annual rainfall is 1737 mm with September as the wettest month. The temperatures are highest on average in August, at around 27.0 °C, and lowest in January, at around 4.7 °C.

Demographics
Per Japanese census data, the population of Suzuka has increased slowly over the past 50 years.

History
Suzuka, as a place name, is mentioned in the Nara period chronicle Nihon Shoki. The ancient Tōkaidō passed through Suzuka, and the Nara-period provincial capital was within its borders. During the Sengoku period, the area was controlled by Oda Nobutaka, the third son of Oda Nobunaga, who ruled from Kanbe Castle. During the Edo period, much of the area was under the control of the 15,000 koku Kanbe Domain, ruled by the Honda clan from 1732 until the Meiji restoration in 1871. During this period, two post stations were within the modern city limits: Ishiyakushi-juku and Shōno-juku, which prospered due to pilgrimage traffic to the Ise Grand Shrine.

After the start of the Meiji period, the area was organized as part of Suzuka District in 1889 and the town of Kanbe was established with the creation of the modern municipalities system on April 1, 1889. On December 1, 1942, Kanbe merged with the villages of Shirako, Inau, Iino, Kawano, Ichinomiya, Mida, Tanagaki, Wakamatsu, Ko, Shono, Takatsuse, Makita, and Ishiyakushi to form the city of Suzuka. The city further expanded in 1954 by annexing the villages of Sakae, Amana and Aikawa and portions of neighboring Kameyama.

Government
Suzuka has a mayor-council form of government with a directly elected mayor and a unicameral city council of 32 members. Suzuka contributes four members to the Mie Prefectural Assembly. In terms of national politics, the city is part of Mie 2nd district of the lower house of the Diet of Japan.

Economy
Suzuka boasts a significant industrial market, having major factories for Sharp and Honda in its bounds. These companies outsource part of their labor to South American nationals to secure a contract-based workforce.

Although the Japanese government encourages mandatory English-language education across the nation, in Suzuka many courses are offered by private cram schools (juku) and by publicly funded institutions supporting Portuguese and Spanish. In a controversial move, the city's governing body, from April 2004, requires all garbage information and local signage to be in Japanese and Portuguese (but not English).

Education

Colleges and universities
Suzuka International University
Suzuka University of Medical Science
Suzuka Junior College
Suzuka National College of Technology

Primary and secondary education
Suzuka has 30 public elementary schools and ten public middle school operated by the city government, and five public high schools operated by the Mie Prefectural Department of Education. There are also one private middle school and one private high school, and the prefecture also operates one special education school for the disabled.

International schools
International schools: Escola Alegria de Saber (エスコーラ・アレグリア・デ・サベール) - Brazilian school Formerly Suzuka had another Brazilian school: Escola Sol Nascente.

Transport

Railway
 JR Tōkai – Kansai Main Line
 -  
Ise Railway – Ise Line
 –  –  –  – 
 Kintetsu Railway - Nagoya Line
 -   -   -  -  -  - 
 Kintetsu Railway - Suzuka Line
 -  -   -  -

Highway
 Higashi-Meihan Expressway
 Shin-Meishin Expressway

Local attractions
Ise Kokubun-ji ruins, National Historic Site
Ise Kokufu ruins, National Historic Site
Ōzuka Kofun, National Historic Site

Sports
Honda Heat rugby club
F.C. Suzuka Rampole football club

Motor racing circuit 

Suzuka Circuit is a Honda-owned racetrack. It has been the home of the Japanese Grand Prix from 1987, except in 2007, 2008, 2020 and 2021. It is the only figure-eight circuit in the championship, and is very popular with the drivers, in spite of its numerous difficult bends. Located next to the circuit is the Honda Safety Riding/Driving School, where thousands of car and motorcycle drivers have been trained, including many police officers and instructors throughout the world.

Sister city relations
 – Le Mans, Maine, France, since May 27, 1990
 – Bellefontaine, Ohio, USA, since August 7, 1991

Notable people
Saitō Ryokuu, Meiji period author
Nobutsuna Sasaki, author, poet
Keisuke Tanimoto, professional baseball player
Takafumi Ogura, professional soccer player
Eisuke Nakanishi, professional soccer player
Miwa Asao, beach volleyball player
Sumie Sakai, professional wrestler

References

External links

 

Brazilian communities
Cities in Mie Prefecture
Populated coastal places in Japan
Suzuka, Mie